The Fil Spadla (2,936 m) is a mountain of the Silvretta Alps, located north of Scuol in the canton of Graubünden, Switzerland. It has two secondary summits: the western summit (2,868 m) and the eastern summit (Piz Spadla, 2,912 m).

References

External links
 Fil Spadla on Hikr

Mountains of Graubünden
Mountains of the Alps
Mountains of Switzerland
Two-thousanders of Switzerland
Scuol